Albert D. Shimek (April 23, 1873 – June 7, 1960) was a member of the Wisconsin State Assembly.

Biography
Shimek was born on April 23, 1873, in Casco, Wisconsin. He graduated from the University of Wisconsin–Stevens Point in 1904 and from Ferris State University in 1908. Shimek became a teacher, both at public and private schools. He died on June 7, 1960.

Political career
Shimek was a member of the Assembly from 1933 to 1940. Additionally, he was President of the Algoma, Wisconsin School Board. He was a Democrat.

References

People from Kewaunee County, Wisconsin
Democratic Party members of the Wisconsin State Assembly
School board members in Wisconsin
Educators from Wisconsin
University of Wisconsin–Stevens Point alumni
Ferris State University alumni
1873 births
1960 deaths
People from Algoma, Wisconsin